The 1993 England rugby union tour of Canada was a series of five matches played by the England national rugby union team in Canada in May and June 1993. The English team won four matches and lost one. They drew their two match international series against the Canada national rugby union team, losing the first game and winning the second to share the series one-all. Sixteen England players were taking part in the 1993 British Lions tour to New Zealand at the time so the team was not fully representative of England's strength. England did not award full international caps for the matches with Canada.

Results
Scores and results list England's points tally first.

Touring party

Manager: Peter Rossborough
Coach: Mike Slemen
Assistant Coach: K. Richardson
Captain: John Olver

Full backs
David Pears (Harlequins)
Alan Buzza (Wasps)

Three-quarters
Steve Hackney (Leicester)
Nick Beal (Northampton)
Chris Oti (Wasps)
Adedayo Adebayo (Bath)
John Fletcher (Tynedale)
Phil de Glanville (Bath)
Damian Hopley (Wasps)
Graham Childs (Wasps)
Stuart Potter (Leicester)

Half-backs
Paul Challinor (Harlequins)
Paul Grayson (Waterloo)
S. Douglas (Newcastle Gosforth)
Matt Dawson (Northampton)
Kyran Bracken (Saracens)

Forwards
Graham Rowntree (Leicester)
Martin Hynes (Orrell)
Darren Garforth (Leicester)
Victor Ubogu (Bath)
John Olver (Northampton)
Kevin Dunn (Wasps)
Martin Johnson (Leicester)
Andy Blackmore (Bristol)
Alex Snow (Harlequins)
Nigel Redman (Bath)
Jon Hall (Bath)
Mark Rennell (Bedford) replacement during tour
Tim Rodber (Northampton)
Matt Greenwood (Wasps)
Dean Ryan (Wasps)
Steve Ojomoh (Bath)
Neil Back (Leicester)
Richard Langhorn (Harlequins) replacement during tour

References

Rugby union tours of Canada
England national rugby union team tours
England
1993 in Canadian rugby union
tour